Randy Edmunds may refer to:

 Randy Edmunds (American football) (born 1946), American football linebacker
 Randy Edmunds (politician), Canadian politician in Newfoundland and Labrador